This is a list of government agencies of the Hong Kong Government.

The policies of the government are formulated decided by the bureaux led by secretaries and permanent secretaries are discussed in the Executive Council and implemented by the departments and agencies. Each department or agency reports to one or more policy bureaux, or directly to the Chief Executive, the Chief Secretary for Administration or Financial Secretary.

Following his re-election in 2007, Donald Tsang ordered a reorganisation of the Government Secretariat, increasing the number of policy bureaux to 12.

Chief Executive

Chief Executive: John Lee
Office of the Chief Executive
Independent Commission Against Corruption
Audit Commission
Policy Innovation and Co-ordination Office
Public Service Commission
Office of the Ombudsman
Secretary for Justice
Chief Secretary for Administration
Financial Secretary

Secretary for Justice

Secretary for Justice: Paul Lam
Deputy Secretary for Justice: Horace Cheung
Department of Justice

Chief Secretary for Administration
(“Department of Administration” per Article 60 of the Basic Law)

Chief Secretary for Administration’s Office 
Chief Secretary for Administration: Eric Chan
Administration Wing
Legal Aid Department

Civil Service Bureau

Secretary for the Civil Service: Ingrid Yeung
Permanent Secretary for the Civil Service: Clement Leung
Joint Secretariat for the Advisory Bodies on Civil Service and Judicial Salaries and Conditions of Service (JSSCS)

Constitutional and Mainland Affairs Bureau

Secretary for Constitutional and Mainland Affairs: Erick Tsang
Under Secretary for Constitutional & Mainland Affairs: Clement Woo
Permanent Secretary for Constitutional and Mainland Affairs: Roy Tang
Registration and Electoral Office
Beijing Office
Hong Kong Economic and Trade Offices (Mainland China, and Taiwan)

Education Bureau

Secretary for Education: Christine Choi
Under Secretary for Education: (vacant)
Permanent Secretary for Education: Michelle Li
Working Family and Student Financial Assistance Agency
University Grants Committee Secretariat

Environment and Ecology Bureau

Secretary for Environment and Ecology: Tse Chin-wan
Under Secretary for the Environment: (vacant)
Permanent Secretary for Environment and Ecology (Environment)/Director of Environmental Protection: Janice Tse
Permanent Secretary for Environment and Ecology (Food): Vivian Lau
Environmental Protection Department
Hong Kong Observatory
Agriculture, Fisheries and Conservation Department
Food and Environmental Hygiene Department
Government Laboratory

Health Bureau

Secretary for Food and Health: Lo Chung-mau
Under Secretary for Food and Health: (vacant)
Permanent Secretary for Health: Thomas Chan
Department of Health

Home and Youth Affairs Bureau

Secretary for Home and Youth Affairs: Alice Mak
Under Secretary for Home and Youth Affairs: (vacant)
Permanent Secretary for Home and Youth Affairs: Shirley Lam
Home Affairs Department
Information Services Department

Labour and Welfare Bureau

Secretary for Labour and Welfare: Chris Sun
Under Secretary for Labour and Welfare: Ho Kai-ming
Permanent Secretary for Labour and Welfare: Alice Lau
Labour Department
Social Welfare Department

Security Bureau

Secretary for Security: Chris Tang
Under Secretary for Security: (vacant)
Permanent Secretary for Security: Patrick Li
Auxiliary Medical Service
Civil Aid Service
Correctional Services Department
Customs and Excise Department
Fire Services Department
Government Flying Service
Hong Kong Police Force
Immigration Department

Culture, Sports and Tourism Bureau

Secretary for Culture, Sports and Tourism: Kevin Yeung
Under Secretary for Culture, Sports and Tourism: (vacant)
Permanent Secretary for Culture, Sports and Tourism: Joe Wong Chi-cho
Leisure and Cultural Services Department
Tourism Commission
Create Hong Kong

Financial Secretary

(“Department of Finance” per Article 60 of the Basic Law)

Financial Secretary: Paul Chan
Deputy Financial Secretary: Michael Wong
Office of the Government Economist
Hong Kong Monetary Authority

Commerce and Economic Development Bureau

Secretary for Commerce and Economic Development: Algernon Yau
Under Secretary for Commerce and Economic Development: Bernard Chan Pak-li
Permanent Secretary for Commerce and Economic Development: Eliza Lee Man-ching
Intellectual Property Department
Invest Hong Kong (InvestHK)
Office of the Communications Authority (OFCA)
Post Office
Radio Television Hong Kong (RTHK)
Trade and Industry Department
Hong Kong Economic and Trade Offices (Overseas) (HKETOs)

Development Bureau

Secretary for Development: Bernadette Linn
Under Secretary for Development: (vacant)
Permanent Secretary for Development (Works): Ricky Lau Chun-kit
Permanent Secretary for Development (Planning and Lands): (vacant)
Architectural Services Department
Buildings Department
Civil Engineering and Development Department
Drainage Services Department
Electrical and Mechanical Services Department
Land Registry
Lands Department
Planning Department
Water Supplies Department

Financial Services and the Treasury Bureau

Secretary for Financial Services and the Treasury: Christopher Hui
Under Secretary for Financial Services and the Treasury: Joseph Chan Ho-lim
Permanent Secretary for the Financial Services and the Treasury (Treasury): Cathy Chu
Permanent Secretary for the Financial Services and the Treasury (Financial Services): Salina Yan
Census and Statistics Department
Company Registry
Government Logistics Department
Government Property Agency
Inland Revenue Department
Insurance Authority
Official Receiver's Office
Rating and Valuation Department
The Treasury

Innovation, Technology and Industry Bureau

Secretary for Innovation, Technology and Industry: Dong Sun
Under Secretary for Innovation and Technology: (vacant)
Permanent Secretary for the Innovation and Technology: Annie Choi
Innovation and Technology Commission
Office of the Government Chief Information Officer
Efficiency Office

Transport and Logistics Bureau

Secretary for Transport and Logistics: Lam Sai-hung
Under Secretary for Transport and Logistics: (vacant)
Permanent Secretary for Transport and Logistics: Mable Chan
Civil Aviation Department
Highways Department
Marine Department
Transport Department

Housing Bureau

Secretary for Housing: Winnie Ho
Under Secretary for Housing: (vacant)
Permanent Secretary for Housing/Director of Housing: Agnes Wong
Housing Department

Related bodies and organisations
Airport Authority Hong Kong
Chinese Medicine Council of Hong Kong
Commission On Youth
Committee on the Promotion of Civic Education
Competition Policy Advisory Group
Construction Industry Council
Construction Industry Training Authority
Consumer Council
Council for the AIDS Trust Fund
Education Commission
Elderly Commission
Electoral Affairs Commission
Electronic Investor Resources Centre
Employees Retraining Board
Equal Opportunities Commission 
Estate Agents Authority
Hong Kong Arts Centre
Hong Kong Arts Development Council
Hong Kong Council for Academic Accreditation
Hong Kong Council on Smoking and Health
Hong Kong Examinations and Assessment Authority
Hong Kong Exchanges and Clearing Limited (HKEx)
Hong Kong Export Credit Insurance Corporation
Hong Kong Housing Society
Hong Kong International Arbitration Centre
Hong Kong Logistics Development Council
Hong Kong Maritime and Port Board
Hong Kong Mortgage Corporation Limited
Hong Kong Productivity Council
Hong Kong Science and Technology Parks Corporation
Hong Kong Sports Institute Limited
Hong Kong Tourism Board
Hong Kong Trade Development Council
Hospital Authority
Independent Police Complaints Council
Kowloon-Canton Railway Corporation
Law Reform Commission of Hong Kong
Legal Aid Services Council
Mandatory Provident Fund Schemes Authority
MTR Corporation Limited
Occupational Safety and Health Council
Office of the Communications Authority
Office of the Privacy Commissioner for Personal Data, Hong Kong 
Official Solicitor's Office
Provisional Construction Industry Co-ordination Board
Quality Education Fund
Public Works Department
Review Body on Bid Challenges
Secretariat, Commissioner on Interception of Communications and Surveillance
Securities and Futures Appeals Tribunal
Securities and Futures Commission
Security and Guarding Services Industry Authority
Standing Commission on Civil Service Salaries and Conditions of Service
Standing Committee on Directorate Salaries and Conditions of Service
Standing Committee on Disciplined Services Salaries and Conditions of Service
Standing Committee on Judicial Salaries and Conditions of Service
Tourism Commission
Town Planning Appeal Board
Town Planning Board
Transport Complaints Unit
Urban Renewal Authority
Vocational Training Council
Women's Commission

See also

1823 Call Centre
Hong Kong Civil Service
Hong Kong government officials

References

External links
Government and Related Organisations (Chi)
Hong Kong Disciplined Services 
Permanent Secretaries and Heads of Government Departments (Chi)

 
Government agencies
Politics of Hong Kong
Hong Kong
Government